Bratislav Petković (26 September 1948 – 9 May 2021) was a Serbian film director, playwright, theater director, founder and director of the Automobile Museum and Modern Garage Theater in Belgrade.

He was a former Minister of Culture and Information in the Government of Serbia.

Awards 

 Order of Karađorđe's Star (posthumous, 2021)

References

1948 births
2021 deaths
Politicians from Belgrade
Serbian dramatists and playwrights
Government ministers of Serbia
Serbian Progressive Party politicians
Theatre people from Belgrade